Jürgen Spieß (also spelled Spiess, born March 26, 1984, in Heidelberg, Baden-Württemberg) is a German weightlifter competing in the 94 kg category.

He competed in Weightlifting at the 2008 Summer Olympics finishing 9th with a total of 384 kg.

At the 2009 European Championships he won overall gold in the 94 kg category, with a total of 390 kg.

At the 2012 Summer Olympics, having moved up to heavyweight (105 kg), he finished 9th in that category also. At the 2016 Summer Olympics, he finished 10th in the heavyweight category.

References

External links 
 
 
 
 
 

1984 births
Living people
Sportspeople from Heidelberg
German male weightlifters
Weightlifters at the 2008 Summer Olympics
Weightlifters at the 2012 Summer Olympics
Weightlifters at the 2016 Summer Olympics
Olympic weightlifters of Germany
European Weightlifting Championships medalists
20th-century German people
21st-century German people